The Women's Professional Lacrosse League (WPLL) was a women's lacrosse league in the United States. The league was formally composed of five teams: the Brave, Command, Fight, Fire, and Pride. The league announced on February 27, 2020, that it would restructure and downsize the league to four teams,  which would ultimately be: the Brave, Command, Fight, and Pride. League play started on Saturday, June 2, 2018.  After cancelling the 2020 season in April due to the COVID-19 pandemic, the league announced on August 6, 2020, that it would be closing down, and that some of its athletes would be given opportunities to play with Athletes Unlimited.   The new Athletes Unlimited league began play in July 2021.

Teams

Media coverage
On April 16, 2019, ESPN and the WPLL announced that the 10-game 2019 regular season would air on ESPN3 and the ESPN App. Meanwhile, the postseason semifinals would on ESPN3, with the championship game airing on ESPNU.

See also
United Women's Lacrosse League, professional women's lacrosse league in North America
Premier Lacrosse League, professional men's field lacrosse league in North America
Major League Lacrosse, professional men's field lacrosse league in North America
National Lacrosse League, professional men's box lacrosse league in North America
List of professional sports teams in the United States and Canada
Women's sports

References

External links

 

 
Women's lacrosse in the United States
Lacrosse leagues in the United States
Professional sports leagues in the United States
Sports leagues established in 2018
2018 establishments in the United States
Premier Lacrosse League partnerships